Miranpur Pinwat, also spelled Pinvat, is a village in Sarojaninagar block of Lucknow district, Uttar Pradesh, India. As of 2011, its population was 4,656, in 888 households. A regular market is held here, and there is also a public library. It is the seat of a gram panchayat.

References 

Villages in Lucknow district